The Latin Grammy Award for Best Banda Album is an honor presented annually at the Latin Grammy Awards, a ceremony that recognizes excellence and creates a wider awareness of cultural diversity and contributions of Latin recording artists in the United States and internationally. The award goes to solo artists, duos, or groups for releasing vocal or instrumental albums containing at least 51% of new recordings in the banda music genre.

The award was first presented to Banda el Recodo for the album Lo Mejor de Mi Vida at the 1st Latin Grammy Awards ceremony in 2000. They are the most awarded band in this category with eight wins out of eleven nominations and are followed by Los Horóscopos de Durango, the first and so far only non-Mexican performer to win, and Joan Sebastian each with two wins. Banda Machos hold the record for most nominations without a win, with six. Chiquis Rivera became the first solo female singer to win for Playlist.

Winners and nominees

2000s

2010s

2020s

 Each year is linked to the article about the Latin Grammy Awards held that year.

See also
Grammy Award for Best Banda or Norteño Album
Latin Grammy Award for Best Regional Song

References

General
  Note: User must select the "Regional Field" category as the genre under the search feature.

Specific

External links
Official site of the Latin Grammy Awards

 
Banda music
Banda
Banda Album